The Sling Aircraft Sling 4 is a South African kit aircraft. It is a development of the Sling 2 to accommodate four people, produced by Sling Aircraft of Johannesburg, South Africa.

Design and development
The Sling 4 is an all-metal, low-wing, fixed tricycle gear kit aircraft, developed in 2011. The canopy was modified to include gull-wing doors. The aircraft has flaps with 40 degrees of travel.

It has been estimated that building a Sling 4 requires 900-1,200 man-hours of work. The aircraft can be supplied as a kit, or built by the factory.

The US Aircraft Owners and Pilots Association (AOPA) tested the Sling 4 in 2016, citing a completed base price of US$123,417, rising to $192,000 with most options.

Operational history
In July 2013, a Sling 4 was flown by Mike Blyth and his son from South Africa to AirVenture in Oshkosh, Wisconsin, United States, carrying 20 hours endurance in fuel. The flight included a 14-hour leg over water.

A Sling 4 kit was completed in four days by 40 workers from the factory, and flown at a 2014 South African Airshow.

In a 2016 detailed review for Flying magazine, writer Marc C. Lee praised the design's controls, handling, aesthetics and load -carrying capabilities, while pointing out that it lacks cruise speed, an effective heater, has poor rubber molding and lacks a USB jack system. He also noted it has no mechanism whereby one could taxi with the gull-wing doors half open or cracked.

A group of about 20 South African teenagers built a Sling 4 in about three weeks in 2019, with the engine and avionics fitted by specialists. and planned to fly it to Cairo.

Variants
Sling 4
Base model with  Rotax 914UL turbocharged engine, introduced in 2011.
Sling TSi
Model fitting the  Rotax 915 iS engine, introduced in 2018, with improved aerodynamics, faster cruise speed and a slightly higher useful load.

Specifications (2016 model Sling 4)

See also
Similar aircraft
Alpi Pioneer 400
Vans RV-10

References

External links

 

2010s South African aircraft
Aircraft first flown in 2011
Low-wing aircraft
Single-engined tractor aircraft
Homebuilt aircraft